"Baatein Yeh Kabhi Na"  is a song from Khamoshiyan, a 2015 Indian romantic horror film. The male version of this song was sung by Arijit Singh and the female version of this song by Palak Muchhal. It was composed by Jeet Gannguli with lyrics penned by Sayeed Quadri.

Recognition and in popular culture

The song received significant media coverage in the Indian media when a Pakistani fruit seller sang the song, and a talent scouting organization from Pakistan uploaded the video on social media.

The song received further recognition when a security guard named Adarsh Singh sung the song and the video of him singing went viral on social media. The guard is believed to be fan of Arijit Singh, as he had previously sung other songs by Singh.

Male version
"Baatein Yeh Kabhi Na" song features the voice and singing of Arijit Singh.The song is picturised on Gurmeet Chaudhary, Sapna Pabbi and Ali Fazal.The song was produced by Vishesh Films, whereas Sony Music India holds the copyright for the song.

Critical reception
Zee News wrote in its review, "Baatein Ye Kabhi Na" song brims with romance between the star cast and is a beautiful number sung by the singer with a scintillating voice, Arijit Singh.

"India.com" in its review wrote, Arijit Singh's soulful voice has added life to the beautiful lyrics penned by Sayeed Quadri. Jeet Gannguli has composed the music for this romantic number.

References

2015 songs
Songs with lyrics by Sayeed Quadri
Songs with music by Jeet Gannguli
Hindi film songs